Valencia is the capital of the autonomous community of Valencia and the third-most populated municipality in Spain, with 791,413 inhabitants. It is also the capital of the province of the same name. The wider urban area also comprising the neighbouring municipalities has a population of around 1.6 million, constituting one of the major urban areas on the European side of the Mediterranean Sea. It is located on the banks of the Turia, on the east coast of the Iberian Peninsula, at the Gulf of Valencia, north of the Albufera lagoon.

Valencia was founded as a Roman colony in 138 BC. Islamic rule and acculturation ensued in the 8th century, together with the introduction of new irrigation systems and crops. Aragonese Christian conquest took place in 1238, and so the city became the capital of the Kingdom of Valencia. The city's population thrived in the 15th century, owing to trade with the rest of the Iberian Peninsula, Italian ports and other locations in the Mediterranean sea, becoming one of the largest European cities by the end of the century. Already harmed by the emergence of the Atlantic Ocean in detriment of the Mediterranean in the global trade networks and the insecurity created by Barbary piracy throughout the 16th century, the city's economic activity experienced a crisis upon the expulsion of the moriscos in 1609. The city became a major silk-manufacturing centre in the 18th century. The city served as the accidental seat of the Spanish Government from 1936 to 1937 during the Spanish Civil War.

The city's port is the 5th-busiest container port in Europe and the second busiest container port on the Mediterranean Sea. The city is ranked as a Gamma-level global city by the Globalization and World Cities Research Network. Due to its long history, Valencia has numerous celebrations and traditions, such as the Falles, which were declared Fiestas of National Tourist Interest of Spain in 1965 and an intangible cultural heritage by UNESCO in November 2016. In 2022, the city was voted the world’s top destination for expats, based on criteria such as quality of life and affordability. 
Joan Ribó from Compromís has been the mayor of Valencia since 2015.

Name

The Latin name of the city was Valentia, meaning "strength" or "valour", due to the Roman practice of recognising the valour of former Roman soldiers after a war. The Roman historian Livy explains that the founding of Valentia in the 2nd century BC was due to the settling of the Roman soldiers who fought against a Lusitanian rebel, Viriatus, during the Third Lusitanian Raid of the Lusitanian War.

During the rule of the Muslim kingdoms in Spain, it had the title Medina at-Tarab ('City of Joy') according to one transliteration, or Medina at-Turab ('City of Sands') according to another, since it was located on the banks of the River Turia. It is not clear if the term Balansiyya was reserved for the entire Taifa of Valencia or also designated the city.

In Valencian, e with grave accent (è) indicates /ɛ/ in contrast to /e/, but the word València is an exception to this rule, since è is pronounced /e/. The spelling "València" was approved by the AVL based on tradition after a debate on the matter. The name "València" has been the only official name of the city since 2017.

Geography

Location

Located on the eastern coast of the Iberian Peninsula and the western part of the Mediterranean Sea, fronting the Gulf of Valencia, Valencia lies on the highly fertile alluvial silts accumulated on the floodplain formed in the lower course of the Turia River. At its founding by the Romans, it stood on a river island in the Turia,  from the sea.

The albufera and its environment are exploited for the cultivation of rice in paddy fields, and for hunting and fishing purposes.

In 1976, because of its cultural, historical, and ecological value, it was declared a natural park.

Climate

The climate of Valencia is a Mediterranean climate (Köppen: Csa) with mild winters and hot, dry summers. According to the Siegmund/Frankenberg climate classification, Valencia has a subtropical climate.

The maximum of precipitation occurs in the Autumn, coinciding with the time of the year when cold drop (gota fría) episodes of heavy rainfall—associated to cut-off low pressure systems at high altitude— are common along the Western mediterranean coast. The year-on-year variability in precipitation may be, however, considerable.

Snowfall is extremely rare; the most recent occasion snow accumulated on the ground was on 11 January 1960. Valencia has one of the mildest winters in Europe, owing to its southern location on the Mediterranean Sea and the Foehn phenomenon, locally known as ponentà. The January average is comparable to temperatures expected for May and September in the major cities of northern Europe.

Valencia, on average, has 2,696 sunshine hours per year, from 155 in December (average of 5 hours of sunshine duration a day) to 315 in July (average above 10 hours of sunshine duration a day). Average annual relative humidity is 65%.

History

Roman colony

Valencia is one of the oldest cities in Spain, founded in the Roman period, c. 138 BC, under the name "Valentia Edetanorum". A few centuries later, with the power vacuum left by the demise of the Roman imperial administration, the Catholic Church assumed the reins of power in the city, coinciding with the first waves of the invading Germanic peoples (Suevi, Vandals and Alans, and later the Visigoths).

Middle Ages
The city surrendered to the invading Moors (Arabs) about 714 AD. Abd al-Rahman I laid waste to old Valencia by 788–789. From then on, the name of Valencia (Arabised as Balansiya) appears more related to the wider area than to the city, which is primarily cited as Madînat al-Turâb (city of 'earth', 'sand' or possibly 'dirt') and presumably had a diminished importance throughout the period. During the emiral period, the surrounding territory, under the ascendancy of Berber chieftains, was prone to unruliness. In the wake of the start of the fitna of al-Andalus, Valencia became the head of an independent emirate, initially controlled by eunuchs, and then, after 1021, by Abd al-Azîz (a grandson of Almanzor). Valencia experienced a notable urban development in this period.  Many Jews lived in Valencia, including the accomplished Jewish poet Solomon ibn Gabirol, who spent his last years in the city. After a damaging offensive by Castilian–Leonese forces towards 1065, the territory became a satellite of the Taifa of Toledo, and following the fall of the latter in 1085, a protectorate of "El Cid". A revolt erupted in 1092, handing the city to the Almoravids and forcing El Cid to take the city by force in 1094, henceforth establishing his own principality.

Following the evacuation of the city in 1102, Almoravids took control. As the Almoravid empire crumbled in the mid 12th-century, ibn Mardanīsh took control of eastern al-Andalus, creating a Murcia-centered independent emirate to which Valencia belonged, resisting Almohads until 1172. During the Almohad rule the city perhaps had a population of about 20,000. When the city fell to James I of Aragon, the Jewish population constituted about 7 percent of the total population.

In 1238, King James I of Aragon, with an army composed of Aragonese, Catalans, Navarrese and crusaders from the Order of Calatrava, laid siege to Valencia and on 28 September obtained a surrender. Fifty thousand Moors were forced to leave.

The city endured serious troubles in the mid-14th century, including the decimation of the population by the Black Death of 1348 and subsequent years of epidemics — as well as a series of wars and riots that followed. In 1391, the Jewish quarter was destroyed in a pogrom.

Genoese traders promoted the expansion of the cultivation of white mulberry in the area by the late 14th century, and later introducing innovative silk manufacturing techniques. The city became a centre of production of mulberry and was, at least for a time, a major silk-making centre. The Genoese community in Valencia—merchants, artisans and workers—became, along with Seville's, one of the most important in the Iberian Peninsula.

In 1407, following the model of the Barcelona's institution created some years before, a Taula de canvi (a sort of municipal public bank) was created in Valencia, although its first iteration yielded limited success.

The 15th century was a time of economic expansion, known as the Valencian Golden Age, during which culture and the arts flourished. Concurrent population growth made Valencia the most populous city in the Crown of Aragon. In painting and sculpture, Flemish and Italian trends had an influence on Valencian artists.

Valencia became a major slave trade centre in the 15th century, second only to Lisbon in the West, prompting a Lisbon–Seville–Valencia axis by the second half of the century, powered by the incipient Portuguese slave trade originating in Western Africa. By the end of the 15th century Valencia was one of the largest European cities, being the most populated city in the Hispanic Monarchy and second to Lisbon in the Iberian Peninsula.

Modern history 
Following the death of Ferdinand II in 1516, the nobiliary estate challenged the Crown amid the relative void of power. In 1519, the Taula de Canvis was recreated again, known as Nova Taula. The nobles earned the rejection from the people of Valencia, and the whole kingdom was plunged into armed revolt—the Revolt of the Brotherhoods—and full blown civil war between 1521 and 1522. Muslims vassals were forced to convert in 1526 at behest of Charles V.

Urban and rural delinquency—linked to phenomena such as vagrancy, gambling, larceny, pimping and false begging—as well as the nobiliary banditry consisting of the revenges and rivalries between the aristocratic families flourished in Valencia during the 16th century.

Also during the 16th century, the North-African piracy targeted the whole coastline of the kingdom of Valencia, forcing the fortification of sites. By the late 1520s, the intensification of the activity of the Barbary corsairs along the conflictive domestic situation and the emergence of the Atlantic Ocean in detriment of the Mediterranean in the global trade networks put an end to the economic splendor of the city. The piracy also paved the way for the ensuing development of Christian piracy, that had Valencia as one of its main bases in the Iberian Mediterranean. The Berber threat—initially with Ottoman support—generated great insecurity on the coast, and it would not be substantially reduced until the 1580s.

The crisis deepened during the 17th century with the expulsion in 1609 of the Moriscos, descendants of the Muslim population that had converted to Christianity. The Spanish government systematically forced Moriscos to leave the kingdom for Muslim North Africa. They were concentrated in the former Crown of Aragon, and in the Kingdom of Valencia specifically, they constituted roughly a third of the total population. The expulsion caused the financial ruin of some of the Valencian nobility and the bankruptcy of the Taula de canvi financial institution in 1613.

The decline of the city reached its nadir with the War of Spanish Succession (1702–1709), marking the end of the political and legal independence of the Kingdom of Valencia. During the War of the Spanish Succession, Valencia sided with the Habsburg ruler of the Holy Roman Empire, Charles of Austria. King Charles of Austria vowed to protect the laws of the Kingdom of Valencia (Furs), which gained him the sympathy of a wide sector of the Valencian population. On 24 January 1706, Charles Mordaunt, 3rd Earl of Peterborough, 1st Earl of Monmouth, led a handful of English cavalrymen into the city after riding south from Barcelona, captured the nearby fortress at Sagunt, and bluffed the Spanish Bourbon army into withdrawal.

The English held the city for 16 months and defeated several attempts to expel them. After the victory of the Bourbons at the Battle of Almansa on 25 April 1707, the English army evacuated Valencia and Philip V ordered the repeal of the Furs of Valencia as punishment for the kingdom's support of Charles of Austria. By the Nueva Planta decrees (Decretos de Nueva Planta) the ancient Charters of Valencia were abolished and the city was governed by the Castilian Charter, similarly to other places in the Crown of Aragon.

The Valencian economy recovered during the 18th century with the rising manufacture of woven silk and ceramic tiles. The silk industry boomed during this century, with the city replacing Toledo as the main silk-manufacturing centre in Spain. The Palau de Justícia is an example of the affluence manifested in the most prosperous times of Bourbon rule (1758–1802) during the rule of Charles III. The 18th century was the age of the Enlightenment in Europe, and its humanistic ideals influenced such men as Gregory Maians and Pérez Bayer in Valencia, who maintained correspondence with the leading French and German thinkers of the time.

The 19th century began with Spain embroiled in wars with France, Portugal, and England—but the War of Independence most affected the Valencian territories and the capital city. The repercussions of the French Revolution were still felt when Napoleon's armies invaded the Iberian Peninsula. The Valencian people rose up in arms against them on 23 May 1808, inspired by leaders such as Vicent Doménech el Palleter.

The mutineers seized the Citadel, a Supreme Junta government took over, and on 26–28 June, Napoleon's Marshal Moncey attacked the city with a column of 9,000 French imperial troops in the First Battle of Valencia. He failed to take the city in two assaults and retreated to Madrid. Marshal Suchet began a long siege of the city in October 1811, and after intense bombardment forced it to surrender on 8 January 1812. After the capitulation, the French instituted reforms in Valencia, which became the capital of Spain when the Bonapartist pretender to the throne, José I (Joseph Bonaparte, Napoleon's elder brother), moved the Court there in the middle of 1812. The disaster of the Battle of Vitoria on 21 June 1813 obliged Suchet to quit Valencia, and the French troops withdrew in July.

Ferdinand VII became king after the victorious end of the Peninsular War, which freed Spain from Napoleonic domination. When he returned on 24 March 1814 from exile in France, the Cortes requested that he respect the liberal Constitution of 1812, which seriously limited royal powers. Ferdinand refused and went to Valencia instead of Madrid. Here, on 17 April, General Elio invited the King to reclaim his absolute rights and put his troops at the King's disposition. The king abolished the Constitution of 1812 and dissolved the two chambers of the Spanish Parliament on 10 May. Thus began six years (1814–1820) of absolutist rule, but the constitution was reinstated during the Trienio Liberal, a period of three years of liberal government in Spain from 1820 to 1823.

On the death of King Ferdinand VII in 1833, Baldomero Espartero became one of the most ardent defenders of the hereditary rights of the king's daughter, the future Isabella II. During the regency of Maria Cristina, Espartero ruled Spain for two years as its 18th Prime Minister from 16 September 1840 to 21 May 1841. City life in Valencia carried on in a revolutionary climate, with frequent clashes between liberals and republicans.

The reign of Isabella II as an adult (1843–1868) was a period of relative stability and growth for Valencia. During the second half of the 19th century the bourgeoisie encouraged the development of the city and its environs; land-owners were enriched by the introduction of the orange crop and the expansion of vineyards and other crops. This economic boom corresponded with a revival of local traditions and of the Valencian language, which had been ruthlessly suppressed from the time of Philip V.

Works to demolish the walls of the old city started on 20 February 1865. The demolition works of the citadel ended after the 1868 Glorious Revolution.

Following the introduction of the universal manhood suffrage in the late 19th century, the political landscape in Valencia—until then consisting of the bipartisanship characteristic of the early Restoration period—experienced a change, leading to a growth of republican forces, gathered around the emerging figure of Vicente Blasco Ibáñez. Not unlike the equally republican lerrouxism, the Populist  came to mobilize the Valencian masses by promoting anticlericalism. Meanwhile, in reaction, the right-wing coalesced around several initiatives such as the Catholic League or the re-formulation of the Valencian Carlism and the Valencianism did similarly with organizations such as Valencia Nova or the Unió Valencianista.

In the early 20th century Valencia was an industrialised city. The silk industry had disappeared, but there was a large production of hides and skins, wood, metals and foodstuffs, this last with substantial exports, particularly of wine and citrus. Small businesses predominated, but with the rapid mechanisation of industry larger companies were being formed. The best expression of this dynamic was in the regional exhibitions, including that of 1909 held next to the pedestrian avenue L'Albereda (Paseo de la Alameda), which depicted the progress of agriculture and industry. Among the most architecturally successful buildings of the era were those designed in the Art Nouveau style, such as the North Station (Estació del Nord) and the Central and Columbus markets.

World War I (1914–1918) greatly affected the Valencian economy, causing the collapse of its citrus exports. The Second Spanish Republic (1931–1939) opened the way for democratic participation and the increased politicisation of citizens, especially in response to the rise of Conservative Front power in 1933. The inevitable march to civil war and the combat in Madrid resulted in the removal of the capital of the Republic to Valencia.

After the continuous unsuccessful Francoist offensive on besieged Madrid during the Spanish Civil War, Valencia temporarily became the capital of Republican Spain on 6 November 1936. It hosted the government until 31 October 1937.

The city was heavily bombarded by air and sea, mainly by the fascist Italian airforce, as well as the Francoist airforce with German Nazi support. By the end of the war the city had survived 442 bombardments, leaving 2,831 dead and 847 wounded, although it is estimated that the death toll was higher. The Republican government moved to Barcelona on 31 October of that year. On 30 March 1939, Valencia surrendered and the Nationalist troops entered the city. The postwar years were a time of hardship for Valencians. During Franco's regime speaking or teaching Valencian was prohibited; in a significant reversal it is now compulsory for every schoolchild in Valencia.

The dictatorship of Franco forbade political parties and began a harsh ideological and cultural repression countenanced and sometimes led by the Catholic Church. Franco's regime also executed some of the main Valencian intellectuals, such as Juan Peset, rector of University of Valencia. Large groups of them, including Josep Renau and Max Aub, went into exile.

In 1943 Franco decreed the exclusivity of Valencia and Barcelona for the celebration of international fairs in Spain. These two cities would hold the monopoly on international fairs for more than three decades, until its abolishment in 1979 by the government of Adolfo Suárez. In October 1957, the 1957 Valencia flood, a major flood of the Turia river, left 81 casualties and notable property damage. The disaster led to the remodelling of the city and the creation of a new river bed for the Turia, with the old one becoming one of the city's "green lungs".

The economy began to recover in the early 1960s, and the city experienced explosive population growth through immigration spurred by the jobs created with the implementation of major urban projects and infrastructure improvements. With the advent of democracy in Spain, the ancient kingdom of Valencia was established as a new autonomous entity, the Valencian Community, the Statute of Autonomy of 1982 designating Valencia as its capital.

Valencia has since then experienced a surge in its cultural development, exemplified by exhibitions and performances at such iconic institutions as the Palau de la Música, the Palacio de Congresos, the Metro, the City of Arts and Sciences (Ciutat de les Arts i les Ciències), the Valencian Museum of Enlightenment and Modernity (Museo Valenciano de la Ilustracion y la Modernidad), and the Institute of Modern Art (Institut Valencià d'Art Modern). The various productions of Santiago Calatrava, a renowned structural engineer, architect, and sculptor and of the architect Félix Candela have contributed to Valencia's international reputation. These public works and the ongoing rehabilitation of the Old City (Ciutat Vella) have helped improve the city's livability and tourism is continually increasing.

21st century

On 3 July 2006, a major mass transit disaster, the Valencia Metro derailment, left 43 dead and 47 wounded. Days later, on 9 July, the World Day of Families, during Mass at Valencia's Cathedral, Our Lady of the Forsaken Basilica, Pope Benedict XVI used the Sant Calze, a 1st-century Middle-Eastern artifact that some Catholics believe is the Holy Grail.

Valencia was selected in 2003 to host the historic America's Cup yacht race, the first European city ever to do so. The America's Cup matches took place from April to July 2007. On 3 July 2007, Alinghi defeated Team New Zealand to retain the America's Cup. Twenty-two days later, on 25 July 2007, the leaders of the Alinghi syndicate, holder of the America's Cup, officially announced that Valencia would be the host city for the 33rd America's Cup, held in June 2009.

The results of the Valencia municipal elections from 1991 to 2011 delivered a 24-year uninterrupted rule (1991–2015) by the People's Party (PP) and Mayor Rita Barberá, who was invested to office thanks to the support from the Valencian Union. Barberá's rule was ousted by left-leaning forces after the 2015 municipal election with Joan Ribó (Compromís) becoming the new mayor.

Economy

Valencia enjoyed strong economic growth before the economic crisis of 2008, much of it spurred by tourism and the construction industry,  with concurrent development and expansion of telecommunications and transport. The city's economy is service-oriented, as nearly 84% of the working population is employed in service sector occupations. However, the city still maintains an important industrial base, with 8.5% of the population employed in this sector. Growth has recently improved in the manufacturing sector, mainly automobile assembly; (the large factory of Ford Motor Company lies in a suburb of the city, Almussafes). Agricultural activities are still carried on in the municipality, even though of relatively minor importance with only 1.9% of the working population and  planted mostly in orchards and citrus groves.

Since the onset of the Great Recession (2008), Valencia had experienced a growing unemployment rate, increased government debt, etc. Severe spending cuts had been introduced by the city government.

In 2009, Valencia was designated "the 29th fastest-improving European city". Its influence in commerce, education, entertainment, media, fashion, science and the arts contributes to its status as one of the world's "Gamma" rank global cities.

The Valencia metropolitan area had a GDP amounting to $52.7 billion, and $28,141 per capita.

Port

Valencia's port is the biggest on the Mediterranean western coast, the first of Spain in container traffic  and the second of Spain in total traffic, handling 20% of Spain's exports. The main exports are foodstuffs and beverages. Other exports include oranges, furniture, ceramic tiles, fans, textiles and iron products. Valencia's manufacturing sector focuses on metallurgy, chemicals, textiles, shipbuilding and brewing. Small and medium-sized industries are an important part of the local economy, and before the current crisis unemployment was lower than the Spanish average.

Valencia's port underwent radical changes to accommodate the 32nd America's Cup in 2007. It was divided into two parts—one was unchanged while the other section was modified for the America's Cup festivities. The two sections remain divided by a wall that projects far into the water to maintain clean water for the America's Cup side.

Transport

The public transport is provided by the Ferrocarrils de la Generalitat Valenciana (FGV), which operates the Metrovalencia and other rail and bus services. The Estació del Nord (North Station) is the major railway terminus in Valencia. A second station, Estació de València-Joaquín Sorolla, has been built on land adjacent to this terminus to accommodate high speed AVE trains to and from Madrid, Barcelona, Seville and Alicante.

The City of Valencia also makes available a bicycle sharing system named Valenbisi to both visitors and residents. As of 13 October 2012, the system has 2750 bikes distributed over 250 stations all throughout the city.

The average amount of time people spend commuting with public transit in Valencia, for example to and from work, on a weekday is 44 minutes. 6% of public transit riders, ride for more than 2 hours every day. The average amount of time people wait at a stop or station for public transit is 10 minutes, while 9% of riders wait for over 20 minutes on average every day.

Tourism

Starting in the mid-1990s, Valencia, formerly an industrial centre, saw rapid development that expanded its cultural and tourism possibilities, and transformed it into a newly vibrant city. Many local landmarks were restored, including the ancient Towers of the medieval city (Serrans Towers and Quart Towers), and the Sant Miquel dels Reis monastery (Monasterio de San Miguel de los Reyes), which now holds a conservation library. Whole sections of the old city, for example the Carmen Quarter, have been extensively renovated. The Passeig Marítim, a  long palm tree-lined promenade was constructed along the beaches of the north side of the port (Platja de Les Arenes, Platja del Cabanyal and Platja de la Malva-rosa). The city is an international hub of highly active and diverse nightlife with bars, dance bars and nightclubs staying open well past midnight.

The city has numerous convention centres and venues for trade events, among them the Feria Valencia Convention and Exhibition Centre (Institución Ferial de Valencia) and the Palau de congressos (Conference Palace), and several 5-star hotels to accommodate business travelers.

In its long history, Valencia has acquired many local traditions and festivals, among them the Falles, which were declared Celebrations of International Tourist Interest (Festes d'Interés Turístic Internacional) on 25 January 1965 and UNESCO's intangible cultural heritage of humanity list on 30 November 2016, and the Water Tribunal of Valencia (Tribunal de les Aigües de València), which was declared an intangible cultural heritage of humanity (Patrimoni Cultural Immaterial de la Humanitat) in 2009. In addition to these Valencia has hosted world-class events that helped shape the city's reputation and put it in the international spotlight, e.g., the Regional Exhibition of 1909, the 32nd and the 33rd America's Cup competitions, the European Grand Prix of Formula One auto racing, the Valencia Open 500 tennis tournament, and the Global Champions Tour of equestrian sports. The final round of the MotoGP Championship is held annually at the Circuit de la Comunitat Valenciana.

The 2007 America's Cup yachting races were held at Valencia in June and July 2007 and attracted huge crowds. The Louis Vuitton stage drew 1,044,373 visitors and the America's Cup match drew 466,010 visitors to the event.

In October 2021, Valencia was shortlisted for the European Commission's 2022 European Capital of Smart Tourism award along with Bordeaux, Copenhagen, Dublin, Florence, Ljubljana and Palma de Mallorca.

Government and administration 

Valencia is a municipality, the basic local administrative division in Spain. The Ayuntamiento is the body charged with the municipal government and administration. The Plenary of the ayuntamiento/ajuntament (known as Consell Municipal de València in the case of Valencia) is formed by 33 elected municipal councillors, who in turn invest the mayor. The last municipal election took place on 26 May 2019. Since 2015, Joan Ribó (Compromís) serves as Mayor. He renewed his spell for a second mandate following the 2019 election.

Demographics
The urban area of Valencia extending beyond the administrative city limits has a population of between 1,564,145 and 1,595,000. Also according to Spanish Ministry of Development, Greater Urban Area (es. About 2 million people live in the Valencia metropolitan area. According to the CityPopulation.de, metropolitan area has a population of 1,770,742, according to the Organization for Economic Cooperation and Development: 2,300,000, according to the World Gazetteer: 2,513,965 and according to the Eurostat: 2,522,383. Between 2007 and 2008 there was a 14% increase in the foreign born population with the largest numeric increases by country being from Bolivia, Romania and Italy. This growth in the foreign born population, which rose from 1.5% in the year 2000 to 9.1% in 2009, has also occurred in the two larger cities of Madrid and Barcelona. The main countries of origin were Romania, United Kingdom and Bulgaria.

The 10 largest groups of foreign born people in 2018 were:

Culture

Valencia is known internationally for the Falles (Les Falles), a local festival held in March, as well as for paella valenciana, traditional Valencian ceramics, craftsmanship in traditional dress, and the architecture of the City of Arts and Sciences, designed by Santiago Calatrava and Félix Candela.

There are also a number of well-preserved traditional Catholic festivities throughout the year. Holy Week celebrations in Valencia are considered some of the most colourful in Spain.

Valencia was once the site of the Formula One European Grand Prix, first hosting the event on 24 August 2008, but was dropped at the beginning of the Grand Prix 2013 season, though still holds the annual Moto GP race at the Circuit Ricardo Tormo, usually that last race of the season in November.

The University of Valencia (officially Universitat de València Estudi General) was founded in 1499, being one of the oldest surviving universities in Spain and the oldest university in the Valencian Community. It was listed as one of the four leading Spanish universities in the 2011 Shanghai Academic Ranking of World Universities.

In 2012, Boston's Berklee College of Music opened a satellite campus at the Palau de les Arts Reina Sofia, its first and only international campus outside the U.S. Since 2003, Valencia has also hosted the music courses of Musikeon, the leading musical institution in the Spanish-speaking world.

Food

Valencia is known for its gastronomic culture. The paella, a simmered rice dish with meat (usually chicken or rabbit) or seafood, was born in Valencia. Other traditional dishes of Valencian gastronomy includes fideuà, arròs a banda, arròs negre (black rice), fartons, bunyols, Spanish omelette, pinchos or tapas and calamares (squid).

Valencia was also the birthplace of the cold xufa beverage known as orxata, popular in many parts of the world, including the Americas.

Languages

Valencian and Spanish are the two official languages. Spanish is currently the predominant language in the city proper. Valencia proper and its surrounding metropolitan area are—along the Alicante area—the traditionally Valencian-speaking territories of the Valencian Community where the Valencian language is less spoken and read. According to a 2019 survey commissioned by the local government, 76% of the population use only Spanish in their daily life, 1.3% only use the Valencian language, while 17.6% of the population use both languages indistinctively. However, vis-à-vis the education system and according to the 1983 regional Law on the Use and Teaching of the Valencian Language, the municipality of Valencia is included within the territory of Valencian linguistic predominance. In 1993, the municipal government agreed to exclusively use Valencian for the signage of new street plaques.

Festivals
Falles

Every year, the five days and nights from 15 to 19 March, called Falles, are a continual festival in Valencia; beginning on 1 March, the popular pyrotechnic events called mascletàes start every day at 2:00 pm. The Falles (Fallas in Spanish) is an enduring tradition in Valencia and other towns in the Valencian Community, where it has become an important tourist attraction. The festival began in the 18th century, and came to be celebrated on the night of the feast day of Saint Joseph, the patron saint of carpenters, with the burning of waste planks of wood from their workshops, as well as worn-out wooden objects brought by people in the neighborhood.

This tradition continued to evolve, and eventually the parots were dressed with clothing to look like people—these were the first ninots, with features identifiable as being those of a well-known person from the neighborhood often added as well. In 1901 the city inaugurated the awarding of prizes for the best Falles monuments, and neighborhood groups still vie with each other to make the most impressive and outrageous creations. Their intricate assemblages, placed on top of pedestals for better visibility, depict famous personalities and topical subjects of the past year, presenting humorous and often satirical commentary on them.

On the night of 19 March, Valencians burn all the Falles in an event called "La Cremà".

Holy Week

Main sights
Major monuments include Valencia Cathedral, the Torres de Serrans, the Torres de Quart (:ca:Torres de Quart), the Lonja de la Seda (declared a World Heritage Site by UNESCO in 1996), and the Ciutat de les Arts i les Ciències (City of Arts and Sciences), an entertainment-based cultural and architectural complex designed by Santiago Calatrava and Félix Candela. The Museu de Belles Arts de València houses a large collection of paintings from the 14th to the 18th centuries, including works by Velázquez, El Greco, and Goya, as well as an important series of engravings by Piranesi. The Institut Valencià d'Art Modern (Valencian Institute of Modern Art) houses both permanent collections and temporary exhibitions of contemporary art and photography.

Architecture
The ancient winding streets of the Barrio del Carmen contain buildings dating to Roman and Arab times. The Cathedral and its bell tower El Miguelete, built between the 13th and 15th centuries, are primarily of Valencian Gothic style but contains elements of Baroque and Romanesque architecture. Beside the cathedral is the Gothic Basilica of the Virgin (Basílica De La Mare de Déu dels Desamparats). The 15th-century Serrans and Quart towers are part of what was once the wall surrounding the city.

UNESCO has recognised the Silk Exchange market (La Llotja de la Seda), erected in early Valencian Gothic style, as a World Heritage Site. The Central Market (Mercat Central) in Valencian Art Nouveau style, is one of the largest in Europe. The main railway station Estació Del Nord is built in Valencian Art Nouveau (a Spanish version of Art Nouveau) style.

World-renowned (and city-born) architect Santiago Calatrava produced the futuristic City of Arts and Sciences (Ciutat de les Arts i les Ciències), which contains an opera house/performing arts centre, a science museum, an IMAX cinema/planetarium, an oceanographic park and other structures such as a long covered walkway and restaurants. Calatrava is also responsible for the bridge named after him in the centre of the city. The Palau de la Música de València (Music Palace) is another noteworthy example of modern architecture in Valencia.

Cathedral

The Valencia Cathedral was called Iglesia Major in the early days of the Reconquista, then Iglesia de la Seu (Seu is from the Latin sedes, i.e., (archiepiscopal) See), and by virtue of the papal concession of 16 October 1866, it was called the Basilica Metropolitana. It is situated in the centre of the ancient Roman city where some believe the temple of Diana stood. In Gothic times, it seems to have been dedicated to the Holy Saviour; the Cid dedicated it to the Blessed Virgin; King James I of Aragon did likewise, leaving in the main chapel the image of the Blessed Virgin, which he carried with him and is reputed to be the one now preserved in the sacristy. The Moorish mosque, which had been converted into a Christian Church by the conqueror, was deemed unworthy of the title of the cathedral of Valencia, and in 1262 Bishop Andrés de Albalat laid the cornerstone of the new Gothic building, with three naves; these reach only to the choir of the present building. Bishop Vidal de Blanes built the chapter hall, and James I added the tower, called El Miguelete in Castilian Spanish or Torre del Micalet in the Valencian language because it was blessed on St. Michael's day in 1418.

In the 15th century the dome was added and the naves extended back of the choir, uniting the building to the tower and forming a main entrance. Archbishop Luis Alfonso de los Cameros began the building of the main chapel in 1674; the walls were decorated with marbles and bronzes in the Baroque style of that period. At the beginning of the 18th century the German Conrad Rudolphus built the façade of the main entrance. The other two doors lead into the transept; one, that of the Apostles in pure pointed Gothic, dates from the 14th century, the other is that of the Palau. The additions made to the back of the cathedral detract from its height. The 18th-century restoration rounded the pointed arches, covered the Gothic columns with Corinthian pillars, and redecorated the walls.

The dome has no lantern, its plain ceiling being pierced by two large side windows. There are four chapels on either side, besides that at the end and those that open into the choir, the transept, and the sanctuary. It contains many paintings by eminent artists. A silver reredos, which was behind the altar, was carried away in the war of 1808, and converted into coin to meet the expenses of the campaign. There are two paintings by Francisco de Goya in the San Francesco chapel. Behind the Chapel of the Blessed Sacrament is a small Renaissance chapel built by Calixtus III. Beside the cathedral is the chapel dedicated to the Our Lady of the Forsaken (Mare de Déu dels Desemparats).

The Tribunal de les Aigües (Water Court), a court dating from Moorish times that hears and mediates in matters relating to irrigation water, sits at noon every Thursday outside the Porta dels Apostols (Portal of the Apostles).

Hospital

In 1409, a hospital was founded and placed under the patronage of Santa Maria dels Innocents; to this was attached a confraternity devoted to recovering the bodies of the unfriended dead in the city and within a radius of  around it. At the end of the 15th century this confraternity separated from the hospital, and continued its work under the name of "Cofradia para el ámparo de los desamparados". King Philip IV of Spain and the Duke of Arcos suggested the building of the new chapel, and in 1647 the Viceroy, Conde de Oropesa, who had been preserved from the bubonic plague, insisted on carrying out their project. The Blessed Virgin was proclaimed patroness of the city under the title of Virgen de los desamparados (Virgin of the Forsaken), and Archbishop Pedro de Urbina, on 31 June 1652, laid the cornerstone of the new chapel of this name. The archiepiscopal palace, a grain market in the time of the Moors, is simple in design, with an inside cloister and achapel. In 1357, the arch that connects it with the cathedral was built. Inside the council chamber are preserved the portraits of all the prelates of Valencia.

Medieval churches

Sant Joan del Mercat- Gothic parish church dedicated to John the Baptist and Evangelist, rebuilt in the Baroque style after a 1598 fire. The interior ceilings were frescoed by Palomino. 
Sant Nicolau
Santa Catalina
Sant Esteve

El Temple (the Temple), the ancient church of the Knights Templar, which passed into the hands of the Order of Montesa and was rebuilt in the reigns of Ferdinand VI and Charles III; the former convent of the Dominicans, at one time the headquarters of the Capitan General, the cloister of which has a Gothic wing and chapter room, large columns imitating palm trees; the Colegio del Corpus Christi, which is devoted to the Blessed Sacrament, and in which perpetual adoration is carried on; the Jesuit college, which was destroyed in 1868 by the revolutionary Committee of the Popular Front, but later rebuilt; and the Colegio de San Juan (also of the Society), the former college of the nobles, now a provincial institute for secondary instruction.

Squares and gardens

The largest plaza in Valencia is the Plaça del Ajuntament; it is home to the City Hall (Ajuntament) on its western side and the central post office (Edifici de Correus) on its eastern side, a cinema that shows classic movies, and many restaurants and bars. The plaza is triangular in shape, with a large cement lot at the southern end, normally surrounded by flower vendors. It serves as ground zero during the Les Falles when the fireworks of the Mascletà can be heard every afternoon. There is a large fountain at the northern end.

The Plaça de la Mare de Déu contains the Basilica of the Virgin and the Turia fountain, and is a popular spot for locals and tourists. Around the corner is the Plaza de la Reina, with the cathedral, orange trees, and many bars and restaurants.

The Turia River was diverted in the 1960s, after severe flooding, and the old riverbed is now the Turia gardens, which contain a children's playground, a fountain, and sports fields. The Palau de la Música is adjacent to the Turia gardens and the City of Arts and Sciences lies at one end. The Valencia Bioparc is a zoo, also located in the Turia riverbed.

Other gardens in Valencia include:
The Jardíns de Monfort (:es:Jardines de Monforte)
The Botanical Garden of Valencia (Jardí Botànic)
The Jardins del Real or Jardins de Vivers (Del Real Gardens) are located in the Pla del Real district, on just the former site of the Del Real Palace.

Museums

Ciutat de les Arts i les Ciències (City of Arts and Sciences). Designed by the Valencian architect Santiago Calatrava, it is situated in the former Túria river-bed and comprises the following monuments:
L'Oceanogràfic, the largest aquarium in Europe, with a variety of ocean beings from different environments: from the Mediterranean, fishes from the ocean and reef inhabitants, sharks, mackerel swarms, dolphinarium, inhabitants of the polar regions (belugas, walruses, penguins), coast inhabitants (sea lions, etc. L'Oceanogràfic exhibits also smaller animals as coral, jellyfish, sea anemones, etc.
El Museu de les Ciències Príncipe Felipe, an interactive museum of science but resembling the skeleton of a whale.
L'Hemisfèric, an IMAX cinema (:es:L'Hemisfèric)
Museu de Prehistòria de València (Prehistory Museum of Valencia)
Museu Valencià d'Etnologia (Valencian Museum of Ethnology)
Blasco Ibáñez House Museum
Institut Valencià d'Art Modern - IVAM – Centre Julio González (Valencian Institute of Modern Art)
Museu de Belles Arts de València (Museum of Fine Arts of Valencia)
Museu Faller (Falles Museum)
Museu d'Història de València (Valencia History Museum)
L'Almoina Museum (Centre Arqueològic de l'Almoina), located near the Cathedral
Natural Science Museum of Valencia, located at Jardins del Real
Museu Taurí de València (Bullfighting Museum)
MuVIM – Museu Valencià de la Il·lustració i la Modernitat (Valencian Museum of Enlightenment and Modernity)
González Martí National Museum of Ceramics and Decorative Arts, housed in the Palace of the Marqués de Dos Aguas
Computer Museum, located within Technical School of Computer Engineering in Technical University of Valencia

Sport

Football
Valencia is also internationally famous for its football club, Valencia CF, one of the most successful clubs in Europe and La Liga, winning the Spanish league a total of six times including in 2002 and 2004 (the year it also won the UEFA Cup), and was a UEFA Champions League runner-up in 2000 and 2001. The club is currently owned by Peter Lim, a Singaporean businessman who bought the club in 2014. The team's stadium is the Mestalla, which can host up to 49,000 fans. The club's city rival, Levante UD, plays its home games at Estadi Ciutat de València.

American football
Valencia is the only city in Spain with two American football teams in LNFA Serie A, the national first division: Valencia Firebats and Valencia Giants. The Firebats have been national champions four times and have represented Valencia and Spain in the European playoffs since 2005. Both teams share the Jardín del Turia stadium.

Motor sports
Once a year between 2008 and 2012 the European Formula One Grand Prix took place in the Valencia Street Circuit. Valencia is among (with Barcelona, Porto and Monte Carlo) the only European cities ever to host Formula One World Championship Grands Prix on public roads in the middle of cities. The final race in 2012 European Grand Prix saw home driver Fernando Alonso win for Ferrari, in spite of starting halfway down the field. The Valencian Community motorcycle Grand Prix (Gran Premi de la Comunitat Valenciana de motociclisme) is part of the Grand Prix motorcycle racing season at the Circuit Ricardo Tormo (also known as Circuit de València), held in November in the nearby town of Cheste. Periodically the Spanish round of the Deutsche Tourenwagen Masters touring car racing Championship (DTM) is held in Valencia.

Rugby League
Valencia is also the home of the Asociación Española de Rugby League, who are the governing body for Rugby league in Spain. The city plays host to a number of clubs playing the sport and to date has hosted all of the country's international home matches. In 2015, Valencia hosted their first match in the Rugby league European Federation C competition, which was a qualifier for the 2017 Rugby League World Cup. Spain won the fixture 40–30.

Districts

Ciutat Vella: La Seu, La Xerea, El Carmen, El Pilar, El Mercat, Sant Francesc
Eixample: Russafa, El Pla del Remei, Gran Via
Extramurs: El Botànic, La Roqueta, La Petxina, Arrancapins
Campanar: Campanar, Les Tendetes, El Calvari, Sant Pau
La Saïdia: Marxalenes, Morvedre, Trinitat, Tormos, Sant Antoni
Pla del Real: Exposició, Mestalla, Jaume Roig, Ciutat Universitària
Olivereta: Nou Moles, Soternes, Tres Forques, La Fontsanta, La Llum
Patraix: Patraix, Sant Isidre, Vara de Quart, Safranar, Favara
Jesús: La Raiosa, L'Hort de Senabre, La Creu Coberta, Sant Marcel·lí, Camí Real
Quatre Carreres: Montolivet, En Corts, Malilla, La Font de Sant Lluís, Na Rovella, La Punta, Ciutat de les Arts i les Ciències
Poblats Marítims: El Grau, El Cabanyal, El Canyameral, La Malva-Rosa, Beteró, Natzaret
Camins del Grau: Aiora, Albors, Creu del Grau, Camí Fondo, Penya-Roja
Algirós: Illa Perduda, Ciutat Jardí, Amistat, Vega Baixa, La Carrasca
Benimaclet: Benimaclet, Camí de Vera
Rascanya: Els Orriols, Torrefiel, Sant Llorenç
Benicalap: Benicalap, Ciutat Fallera

Other towns within the municipality of Valencia
These towns administratively are within districts of Valencia.
Towns north of Valencia city: Benifaraig, Poble Nou, Carpesa, Cases de Bàrcena, Mauella, Massarrojos, Borbotó
Towns west of Valencia city: Benimàmet, Beniferri
Towns south of Valencia city: Forn d'Alcedo, Castellar-l'Oliveral, Pinedo, El Saler, El Palmar, El Perellonet, La Torre

Twin towns – sister cities

Valencia is twinned with:

 Mainz, Germany (1978)
 Bologna, Italy (1980)
 Valencia, Venezuela (1985)
 Veracruz, Mexico (1985)
 Guangzhou, China (2012)
 Xi'an, China (as of 2020, declaration of intent)

Valencia also has friendly relations with:

 Odesa, Ukraine (1981)
 Chengdu, China (2017)

See also

Archdiocese of Valencia
List of tallest buildings in Valencia
Nou Mestalla
Prehistory of the Valencian Community

Notes

References

Informational references

Citations

Bibliography

 

Attribution
This article incorporates information from the equivalent article on the Catalan Wikipedia.
This article incorporates information from the equivalent article on the Spanish Wikipedia.

Further reading

External links

Official website of the city of Valencia (Valencian) 
Official tourism website of the city of Valencia (Valencian) 
Official website of the Community Valenciana tourism
Valencia-The City of Arts & Science
Postal codes in Valencia
spainestate

 
Populated places in the Province of Valencia
Comarques of the Valencian Community
Former national capitals
Mediterranean port cities and towns in Spain
Municipalities in the Province of Valencia
Populated coastal places in Spain
Populated places established in the 2nd century BC
Roman sites in Spain
138 BC
130s BC establishments
Route of the Borgias
Coloniae (Roman)
Capitals of former nations